Beltring is a village in the local government district of Tonbridge and Malling in Kent, England. It is in the civil parish of East Peckham.

Beltring is known for the annual War and peace show which takes place at The Hop Farm Country Park.  Until recently the farm was owned by the Whitbread brewery, but it is now a privately owned country park, and boasts the world's largest collection of Oast houses.

Beltring & Branbridges Halt railway station opened on 1 September 1909, on the Medway Valley Line.

References

External links

Villages in Kent